Bellulia kendricki is a moth of the family Erebidae first described by Michael Fibiger in 2010. It is known from Hainan in China.

References

Micronoctuini
Taxa named by Michael Fibiger
Moths described in 2010